Taobao is a Chinese online shopping platform. It is headquartered in Hangzhou and is owned by Alibaba. According to Alexa rank, it is the eighth most-visited website globally in 2021. Taobao.com was registered on April 21, 2003 by Alibaba Cloud Computing (Beijing) Co., Ltd.

Taobao Marketplace facilitates consumer-to-consumer retail by providing a platform for small businesses and individual entrepreneurs to open online stores that mainly cater to consumers in Chinese-speaking regions (Mainland China, Hong Kong, Macau and Taiwan) and abroad, which is made payable by online accounts. Its stores usually offer an express delivery service.

Sellers are able to post goods for sale either through a fixed price or an auction. Auctions make up a small percentage of transactions, whereas the majority of the products are new merchandise sold at fixed prices. Taobao users usually read feedback and compare items from multiple shops. Taobao's popular payment platform is Alibaba's Alipay

With over 1 billion product listings as of 2016, the combined transaction volume of Taobao Marketplace and Tmall.com reached 3 trillion yuan in 2017.

eBay acquired Eachnet, China's online auction leader at the time, for US$180 million. It became a major contender in the Chinese consumer e-commerce market. To counter eBay's expansion, Taobao offered free listings to sellers. It introduced instant messaging for facilitating buyer-seller communication and an escrow-based payment tool: Alipay. Taobao became mainland China's market leader within two years. Its market share grew from 8% to 59% between 2003 and 2005, while eBay China dropped from 79% to 36%. eBay shut down its Chinese site in 2006.

In October 2010, Taobao beta-launched eTao as an independent search engine for online shopping to provide and merchant information from a number of major consumer e-commerce websites in China. Online shoppers would be able to use the site to compare prices across sellers. According to the Alibaba Group web site, eTao offers products from Amazon China, Dangdang, Gome, Yihaodian, Nike China and Vancl, as well as Taobao and Tmall.

In June 2011, Jack Ma, executive chairman and former chief executive officer of Alibaba Group, announced that Taobao would split into three different companies: Taobao Marketplace (a consumer-to-consumer platform), Tmall.com (a business-to consumer platform, then called Taobao Mall), and eTao (a search engine for online shopping). The move was said to be necessary for Taobao to “meet competitive threats that emerged in the past two years during which the Internet and e-commerce landscape has changed dramatically.”

In 2012 Taobao began to accept international Visa and MasterCard credit and debit cards.

On 29 April 2013, Alibaba announced an investment of US$586 million in Sina Weibo. According to Reuters, the deal “should drive more web traffic to Alibaba's Taobao Marketplace”. On August 1, 2013, Alibaba launched Weibo for Taobao, which allows users to link Sina Weibo accounts with Taobao accounts.

Features

Mascot 

Taobao's mascot is a dialogue bubble, which represents its corporate culture. Ma introduced Taobao to the outside world by stating, "We are the ant army." Ma once organized more than 2,000 employees to gather at a gymnasium to celebrate the 5th anniversary of the founding ceremony. At the party, Taobao employees waved the Taobao mascot — the flag of "ants." At the end of the celebration that lasted for four hours, all the employees stood hand-in-hand, singing "If you do not experience wind and rain, you cannot see the rainbow. The ants that be organized together can beat the elephant."

Shop feedback 

A good way to investigate a Taobao shop is by clicking the shop's rating icon. For Tmall.com shops, people click the stars to view their ratings. Taobao users usually read feedback and compare items from multiple shops. Feedback can be genuine or artificial, requiring users to make their own judgments. Feedback can be posted by competitors.

Every trade deal includes a section of customer feedback. Shop owners often put effort to maximize positive comments. Negotiations may happen between sellers and consumers over their satisfaction ratings.

Taobao uses search tools and other functions to understand user demands. Customers are asked to complete surveys that ask:

 Obstacles encountered 
 Advice and reviews
 Use frequency
 Importance of that particular product
 Satisfaction levels about specific aspects, including visual and typographic layout, procedure and instructions
 Overall satisfaction

Other features 
Taobao Marketplace offers various features and services to create a better user experience for online shoppers and retailers. In January 2010, it launched the Taobao app, created by independent developers through the Taobao Open Platform, to be downloaded by consumers in Taobao App Store.

In March 2010, it introduced the Taobao Data Cube platform, which gives small businesses access to its aggregate consumer transactions data for insight into industry trends.

In June 2010, it partnered with Wasu Media Internet Limited to launch Taohua, a digital entertainment products platform, and interactive digital television shopping, that are operated by a joint-venture formed by the two companies.

Weitao 
Weitao is a private shopping assistant/blog for Taobao/Tmall customers. It is a micro-blogging feature for brands and merchants on its e-commerce sites Taobao and Tmall.

Services

Alipay 

Launched in 2004, Alipay is an escrow-based online payment platform. It is the preferred payment solution for Taobao Marketplace. It is the most widely used third-party online payment solution in China. To ensure safe transactions, Alipay uses an escrow system through which payment is only released to the seller once the buyer has received goods in satisfactory condition. According to the Alibaba Group website, Alipay partners with multiple financial institutions as well as Visa and MasterCard to facilitate payments in China and abroad.

Alipay systems are separate for different groups of users. For instance, Alipay users may send and receive funds if they have an account that have  a credit card issued in China, whereas users with other cards may only use Alipay to pay for goods or services from Taobao. This has proven problematic for international users, as they are unable to receive refunds not issued via the Taobao system.

Regulatory changes issued by the People's Bank of China (Central Bank of China) are set to alter the Chinese online payment ecosystem. Top-tier digital payment services such as WeChat Pay and Alipay transferred all relevant transaction data to appropriate agencies starting June 30, 2018.

AliExpress 

AliExpress was created in April 2010 as an international retailing website. People who live overseas can use the service to purchase items from Chinese manufacturers online.

AliWangWang (TradeManager) 

Taobao Marketplace allows buyer and seller to communicate prior to the purchase through its embedded proprietary instant chat program, named AliWangWang.

Baopals 

In February 2016, 3 expats living in Shanghai launched Baopals, a shopping platform that translates Taobao and Tmall into English so that foreigners living in China can access of its products and services. Over 2.4 million items have been sold on the platform.

Happy Taobao 

In Dec. 2009, Taobao, together with Hunan TV, set up Happy Taobao, Inc for television shopping. Hunan TV launched an entertainment series called "Happy Taobao", while Taobao Marketplace created channels and independent websites.

Taobao Live 
In 2018, Alibaba launched the streaming service named Alibaba Live. This service was created with the goal of allowing online retailers to market their products utilizing social shopping. This has seen significant growth in popularity and success, with the 84 stores using this service reporting $7.4 million in 2020 sales. Taobao stated that they predict live-streaming on their platform will generate over 500 billion sales transactions.Taobao Live now has over 10,000 weblebrities promoting a wide range of items including as cosmetics, apparel, cuisine, and numerous electrical gadgets. Taobao Live's daily sales have already surpassed $3 billion.

Alibaba promotes a new style of live streaming, called cūnbō (村播), that features rural sellers. Taobao has given them their own category in the app, with the purpose of making it easier for these rural sellers to find customers and followers on the platform.

Singles' Day 

Singles' Day (also known as the Double eleven shopping carnival, as in 11/11) is the largest Chinese online shopping day. It takes place on 11 November each year. It takes the advantages of the Chinese singles day that was created by Chinese university students to celebrate their bachelordom. After the event was launched, it obtained widespread attention, attracting other e-commerce companies to imitate this model.

Singles day grew rapidly since its introduction in 2009. 2009 sales reached RMB50 million (￡5.68 million): Sales grew rapidly thereafter:

2009: RMB50 million (￡5.68 million)
2010: RMB900 million (￡102 million)
2011: RMB3.4 billion (￡386 million)
2012: RMB19.1 billion (￡2.17 billion)
2013: RMB35 billion (￡3.97 billion)
2015: RMB91.2 billion
2016: RMB120.7 billion
2017: RMB168.2 billion
2018: RMB213.5 billion
2019: RMB268.4 billion

In 2016, Alibaba introduced the T-mall double eleven party, inviting celebrities who took part in a Victoria's Secret show. At the 2017  party, Jack Ma launched his film Gong Shou Dao (Defend the Homeland with Kungfu).

Because of the huge trading volume and income in Singles Day, Taobao launched another promotional activity on December 12 (12/12), drove record trading every year thereafter.

Strategy 

On March 29, 2016, Alibaba Group CEO Daniel Zhang pointed out three strategic directions for Taobao: more community-based, more content-enabled, and local adapted.

Taobao extensively uses shopping strategies such as data personalizing, customer loyalties, video broadcasting and the focused demand of a single community to build stages for sellers to display their commodities. It is constructing a new ecosystem from content production, to content propagation, and content consumption with Alibaba's cooperating internet platforms, including Youku, Weibo, Alimama and Alifilms.

Technology

Adaptive Agent 

Taobao applies a search tool named 'adaptive agents'. An adaptive agent picks up signals from consumers’ purchase records, including categories, brands, functions and colors etc.; The search engine involves the scanning of a particular bar code. Taobao tracks customers' purchasing history and reorganizes it into selections that the buyer is likely to be attracted to.

An adaptive agent works by updating prior models using new data via Bayes' theorem (Laplace's method). The possibility of the occurrence of a certain event can be estimated through the frequency of its occurrence in the past. The ranking of a product or a page can be determined by the combination of its prior information plus its posterior data of click transaction.

The popularity of Taobao's searching model is based on the calculation of correlation rate and quality scores:
Static score of a product's title (correlation rate).
Matching score of the title and query of a product (correlation rate).
Category model of a product (correlation rate).
Transaction model of the commodity (quality score).
Sellers model (quality score).
Feedback (quality score).

Semantic Search 

Taobao automatically classifies product text and images and uses tags to match. Semantic search solves the correlation problem that keyword texts cannot solve, such as images, complex texts, and ambiguous texts. Semantic search is a recommendation system that presents customers with similar items that consumers might  not find when searching one keyword. Entity tagging and other classifications are used.

Markets

Taobao for Southeast Asia 

In September 2013, Taobao launched its Southeast Asian site. A translation feature is available for major languages in Southeast Asia.

Controversies 
In August 2017, the company removed controversial vendors offering personalised messages featuring African children over concerns of child exploitation. Some Chinese Taobao vendors claimed that their promotional videos featuring African children were "charity activity" in which most of the profits goes to the children. However the situation proved more complicated after a photographer contacted by the Beijing Youth Daily said "the children only received snacks or a few dollars as reward", indicating that there was legitimate child exploitation.

In 2019, Taobao removed all items related to the Houston Rockets in response to the organization's general manager Daryl Morey posting a tweet about Hong Kong.

In October 2020 amid rising geopolitical tensions between Taipei and Beijing, Taobao announced that it would exit the Taiwanese market after the Taiwanese government ordered the company to re-register as being backed by China or to leave the island if they don't.

The mobile app of Taobao was banned in India (along with other Chinese apps) on 2 September 2020 by the government, the move came amid the 2020 China-India skirmish.

In 2022, the Office of the United States Trade Representative named Taobao on its list of Notorious Markets for Counterfeiting and Piracy.

Metrics 

Taobao Marketplace had more than 5 million registered users as of June 2013 and hosted more than 80 million product listings. It facilitated approximately RMB 200 billion in gross merchandise volume in 2009. In September 2013, Taobao ranked 12th overall in Alexa's internet rankings. For the year ending March 31, 2013, the combined gross merchandise volume (GMV) of Taobao and Tmall.com combined exceeded RMB 1 trillion. As of 2021, Taobao was the 8th most visited website in the world and the 5th most visited website in China.

References

External links 
  

2003 establishments in China
Alibaba Group
Internet properties established in 2003
Notorious markets
Chinese brands
Online marketplaces of China
Internet censorship in India